William fitz Duncan (a modern anglicisation of the Old French Guillaume fils de Duncan and the Middle Irish Uilleam mac Donnchada) was a Scottish prince, the son of King Duncan II of Scotland by his wife Ethelreda of Dunbar. He was a territorial magnate in northern Scotland and northern England and a military leader.

In 1094, his father King Duncan II was killed by Mormaer Máel Petair of Mearns, supporting the claims of King Domnall (Donald) III Bán. It is probable that his mother Ethelreda took the infant William and fled Scotland to the safety of Allerdale in Cumberland where her brother Waltheof of Allerdale was lord. William, an only child, grew up there among his cousins. A decade or so later, he ventured to the court of his half-uncle.

Under the reign of his half-uncle Alexander I, it is highly likely that William was regarded as a viable tánaiste (i.e. "designated heir"), but Henry I of England supported David. When David succeeded, William, as the legitimate king under the rules of primogeniture was certainly bought off by David, probably being made tánaiste. William repeatedly leads the lists of witnesses appearing in Scottish royal charters in the reigns of Alexander I and David I.

A 13th century northern English source claims that William was Mormaer of Moray. As this source had no reason to deceive, it is highly likely that William was made the ruler of Moray after the defeat of King Óengus of Moray in 1130. It is feasible that this grant had something to do with the coming of age of David's son, Prince Henry and may also be a factor in his marriage to a daughter of Óengus. As well as being the ruler of Moray, William controlled the English lands of Allerdale, Skipton and Craven, making him one of the greatest barons of northern England.

William was a great warrior. His uncle, King David, frequently tasked William with leading his armies in battle. He frequently led Scottish armies. In the campaign of 1138, he led an army of Gaels that defeated a Norman English army at the Battle of Clitheroe, raising the hopes for the success of the royal army, hopes which failed to materialize at the Battle of the Standard.

William had several marriages. His first marriage was over, presumably through death, by the year 1137, when he married Alice, daughter of William Meschin. By the latter, he had a son, also called William (William of Egremont or William the Atheling), who died in 1160, and three daughters, including Cicely, Lady of Skipton, who married William le Gros, 1st Earl of Albemarle. His marriage brought him the lordship of Copeland, of which his wife was co-heiress.

He also had a large number of bastards, probably including Wimund of the Isles. It is now presumed that Domnall mac Uilleim, and the Meic Uilleim clan that repeatedly rebelled against later Scottish kings in their quest to gain the Scottish throne, were legitimate descendants of a marriage to a daughter of Óengus of Moray. This daughter was a granddaughter and heir general of King Lulach. Domnall mac Uilleim was killed on 31 July 1187 in an uprising against King William the Lion.

William fitz Duncan died in 1147, whereupon Moray reverted back into the hands of David.

Bibliography
 Oram, Richard, David I: The King who made Scotland, (Gloucestershire, 2004)
 Dalton, Paul. 2002. Conquest, Anarchy & Lordship: Yorkshire 1066-1154. Cambridge: Cambridge University Press.

Notes

 

William
11th-century births
1147 deaths
People of The Anarchy
12th-century mormaers
Mormaers of Moray
Heirs apparent who never acceded
Sons of kings